The Five Towns Jewish Times is a weekly newspaper serving the Jewish communities of the Five Towns in southwestern Nassau County, New York, and the greater New York area, covering the area's large and growing Orthodox Jewish community.

The paper grew out of publisher Larry Gordon's response to an effort in 2000 by the Lawrence municipality to limit the establishment and growth of local Orthodox synagogues. Gordon wrote a series of articles for the local Nassau Herald, which resulted in an abrupt policy reversal.  Believing the Orthodox community needed its own media, Gordon established the 5 Towns Jewish Times.  Originally published twice a month, it is now published 50 times a year.

The paper is distributed every Thursday on newsstands and in synagogues and Jewish community centers. It is distributed for free on Long Island and sold for $1.00 in New York City and to weekly subscribers. The current print run each week is 20,000 papers.

References

External links
The Five Towns Jewish Times - Official Site (5TJT.com)

Five Towns
Five Towns Jewish Times, The
Jews and Judaism in New York City
Newspapers published in New York (state)
Weekly newspapers published in the United States